"Games People Play" is a 1980 song by the Alan Parsons Project. It peaked at No. 16 on 14 March 1981 on the Billboard Hot 100 chart as well as No. 18 on Cash Box. It appears on the album The Turn of a Friendly Card and was sung by Lenny Zakatek.

Single version
The single version of the song features two edits, one during the instrumental section preceding the guitar solo, and another shortening the guitar solo. It is also sped up slightly. The "single edit" included on the deluxe anniversary edition of The Turn of a Friendly Card from 2015 is edited differently and presented at the original pitch, so it is not the actual single version.

Charts

Weekly charts

Year-end charts

Release history

References

1980 singles
1980 songs
The Alan Parsons Project songs
Songs written by Alan Parsons
Songs written by Eric Woolfson
Arista Records singles
Song recordings produced by Alan Parsons